The British Royal Train is used to convey senior members of the British royal family and associated staff of the Royal Household around the railway network of Great Britain. It is owned, maintained and operated by DB Cargo UK.

The Royal Train comprises a dedicated set of claret liveried sleeper, dining and lounge carriages. The current rolling stock dates from 1977 to 1987. They are arranged according to requirements, and stored when not in use. The earliest royal coaches date back to the mid-19th century in the reign of Queen Victoria; until an upgrade in 1977 there were multiple sets based in different regions, a legacy of the pre-nationalisation era of railways in Britain. Many are now in museums or on heritage railways; the National Railway Museum in York has a royal themed exhibition.

Dedicated locomotives have never traditionally been part of the Royal Train, first appearing in special livery only in the 1990s, but also seeing use on other trains since 2003. In the 21st century, various preserved (and one new build) steam locomotives have also hauled the train on special occasions. Although regularly cited by critics as one of the unnecessary luxuries of the Royal Family, which has led  to an increase where possible in the  use of normal scheduled services as an alternative, supporters argue the current arrangement emphasises utility over luxury, and is still often the most practical and secure mode of travel to fit the required itinerary and avoid disruption to the public.

The then Duke and Duchess of Cambridge travelled across Britain by the Royal Train in December 2020 to thank communities and key workers for their extraordinary efforts during the COVID-19 pandemic. In November 2020, the American PBS network aired a two-part series, Secrets of Royal Travel, with the first episode featuring the train and its history.

History

The first member of the British Royal Family to travel by train was the Dowager Queen Adelaide who took a train from Nottingham to Leeds on 22 July 1840. Queen Victoria was the first British monarch to travel by train, on 13 June 1842 on the Great Western Railway (GWR), which ran the line between London Paddington and Windsor for Windsor Castle. The train transported the queen from Slough to London Paddington, and was hauled by the locomotive Phlegethon driven by Daniel Gooch assisted by Isambard Kingdom Brunel. The Queen used a royal saloon which had been constructed by the GWR in 1840. According to the historian Kate Williams, the Queen "saw travelling the country as her duty, whereas monarchs didn't necessarily think that before".

The first carriage built for the exclusive use of a member of the British Royal Family was constructed in 1842 by the London and Birmingham Railway for Queen Adelaide. This carriage is now on display in the National Railway Museum in York.

In 1869, Queen Victoria commissioned a pair of coaches for £1,800 with the London and North Western Railway.

In 1874, the GWR built a new royal saloon at its Swindon Works for the use of the queen. It was constructed under the supervision of Joseph Armstrong.

In 1877 the London and South Western Railway built a royal saloon for the use of the queen.

 In 1897 the GWR marked the Diamond Jubilee of Queen Victoria by providing a new royal train of six coaches. Until now, railway companies had provided special saloon carriages, but there was no regular royal train until this one was constructed.

By the 1890s, the Queen's train was equipped with electric lighting and a toilet, although she insisted on stopping at stations to use the facilities. 
 
The Morning Post of 17 April 1899 reported:

Nearly sixty years later, after her funeral in 1901, Queen Victoria's coffin was taken to London Paddington and transported on the royal train back to Windsor where she is buried.

In 1902, her son King Edward VII commissioned new royal saloons from the London and North Western Railway. They were built in the Wolverton Works under the direction of C.A. Park. Two saloons were provided, one for the King and one for the queen. The interior decoration was carried out by S.J. Waring and Sons. The King's saloon had a smoking room in mahogany, with inlays of rosewood and satinwood, a day compartment in the Colonial style, in white enamel. The saloons included electric heating. These saloons are now preserved at the National Railway Museum in York.

In 1908 the Great Northern Railway and North Eastern Railway jointly provided two new saloons and a brake van for use over their lines. King Edward VII used this for the first time on 7 September 1908 for a journey to Ollerton railway station when visiting Rufford Abbey to stay with Lord and Lady Savile for the Doncaster Races.

In 1912 the Midland Railway provided a royal saloon for King George V. It was built at the company workshops in Derby under the supervision of D. Bain, the works superintendent, and fitted out by Waring & Gillow. It was numbered 1910 to mark the year of the king's accession and first used in July 1912 when the king and queen travelled from Yorkshire to London. The Midland Railway company also provided a dining car which could be attached to the saloon when required.

Prior to the partition of Ireland in 1921, royal trains were occasionally used for the British Royal Family when Ireland was under British rule. In 1897 the Great Northern Railway provided a new royal train of six vehicles comprising a drawing-room saloon, a dining saloon, first-class carriage, composite coach, and two vans. This was constructed in their own workshops and used for the first time during a visit by the Duke and Duchess of York in September 1897 and a trip from Banagher to Clara over the tracks of the Great Southern and Western Railway. This use of a royal train continued in Northern Ireland until the last British royal train there in the 1950s.

The Great Western Railway abandoned its old royal saloons of 1897 during the 1930s and borrowed stock from the LMS when required.  In 1941 the LMS built three armour-plated saloons with safe cabinets for documents, for King George VI who travelled to parts of England that were under bombing raids during World War II. During that era, the existence of the Royal Train was still a state secret.

Shortly after the war, the armour plating was removed. New saloons were provided by the royal family for their train. Two of these cars have survived into preservation.

After the formation of British Railways in 1948, the individual regions continued to maintain the constituent railway companies' royal train carriages. A single "Royal Train" was formed in 1977 as a response to the demands of the Silver Jubilee of Elizabeth II. The royal family have also travelled on ordinary service trains more frequently in recent years to minimise costs.

Queen Elizabeth was presented with the current Royal Train in 1977, with the carriages painted "a rich burgundy colour known as Royal Claret". The interiors have since been upgraded; some of the features ensure greater safety for their occupants.

The train currently consists nine carriages, seven of these being of the British Rail Mark 3 design, including two that were built for the prototype HST train. Not all of these are used to form a train, as different vehicles have specified purposes. A 2020 report states that they include a lounge for the Queen, another for Prince Philip, as well as carriages that serve as bedrooms, bathrooms, a dining car, a couchette, and so on. The Queen's private carriage includes a "bathroom complete with a full-sized bathtub". Carriages are also available for staff, including sleeping quarters.

Two locomotives are designated for use on the train, and a third is available. All are painted in the claret livery of the royal household, but are used for other traffic when not hauling the royal train. A 2020 report stated that the Class 67 locomotives use "bio-fuel made from waste vegetable oil". 

The carriages may be used for other heads of state, but they cannot be hired by private users. It was used to convey officials to the 24th G8 summit in May 1998. When not in use, the train is stored in Wolverton Works, where it is maintained by DB Cargo UK. 
 
As part of the privatisation of British Rail, ownership passed to Railtrack. It is currently owned by Network Rail.

Train drivers are specially selected based on their skills, including the ability to make a station stop within six inches of the designated position.

Incidents

On 10 October 1881 the train carrying the Prince and Princess of Wales and Princess Louise from Ballater to Aberdeen lost a tyre from one of the tender wheels. 

In November 1883, at the time of the Fenian dynamite outrages in England, the government received anonymous information that an attempt would be made against Queen Victoria's forthcoming journey from Windsor to Ballater. The report could not be corroborated, and could have been a mischievous hoax, but the Home Secretary, William Harcourt, asked George Findlay, general manager of the LNWR, to arrange special protection. Jointly with the other companies along the route, platelayers and other workers were mobilised to inspect every bridge along the  journey and to watch over the line, each watcher in sight of the next, until the train had passed.
 
On 21 June 1898, David Fenwick, engine driver, was killed whilst driving the Royal Train between Aberdeen and Perth. The inquest found that he had climbed onto the coal tender to attempt to resolve a problem with the communication cord, and was killed after an impact with a bridge.

The Royal Train has had a very good service record. However, Gerald Fiennes wrote in his autobiography I Tried to Run a Railway of one incident on the Eastern Region when an ex-LNER A4 class 4-6-2 was used to pull the Royal Train. The first vehicle was a BR Midland Region generator van, and the difference between the 'buckeye' couplings on the A4 and on the van was about 2". Various attempts to separate the couplings failed, leading the crew to couple up the station pilot (standing at the rear of the train) and apply the brakes. The A4's regulator was then opened to full cut-off, resulting in the engine breaking free from the generator van and rushing off up the track. Presumably the standard screw coupling was then used instead of the 'buckeye' couplings on the two vehicles, which would have required an inspection due to the various attempts to break them apart.

In June 2000, a member of the Royalty Protection Branch (SO14) accidentally discharged his 9mm Glock automatic pistol while the train was halted for an overnight stop in South Wales. Both the Queen and Prince Philip were on board at the time, but were undisturbed by the accidental discharge, only becoming aware of it the following morning when notified by staff.

Locomotives nominated for the Royal Train

Although railways often had nominated locomotives for hauling the Royal Train (with special high maintenance regimes), no locomotives were dedicated solely to the train until the 1990s, when two Class 47 locomotives were painted in the claret livery of the Royal Household and were dedicated solely to Royal Train duty until they were replaced in 2003 by two Class 67 locomotives, both operated by EWS (now DB Cargo UK). The new locomotives are often used for special charter train services and on other occasional passenger services when not required. Occasionally the Royal Train is hauled by other engines.

Locomotives nominated for working the Royal Train have included:
1990–2004: Class 47 47834 Fire Fly and 47835 Windsor Castle (in InterCity livery) and later refurbished, renumbered and renamed 47798 Prince William and 47799 Prince Henry (in Royal claret). Both are now withdrawn and have entered preservation: Prince William is preserved at the National Railway Museum, York, while Prince Henry is at the Eden Valley Railway, Warcop. 
Since 2004: Class 67 67005 Queen's Messenger and 67006 Royal Sovereign (in Royal claret). Since 2012 an extra locomotive, Class 67 67026 Diamond Jubilee (in Diamond Jubilee silver), has been allocated to Royal duties.

Steam locomotives 

In the pre-preservation era, the Royal Train was always hauled by steam locomotives for the relevant British Rail region. Examples of royal trains hauled by preserved steam are as follows. In preservation examples include the visit of Prince Edward, Duke of Kent to the Keighley and Worth Valley Railway on 10 July 2008: 6233 Duchess of Sutherland (an LMS Princess Coronation Class 4-6-2), 6024 King Edward I (a GWR 'King' Class 4-6-0), and 60163 Tornado (a new LNER-design Peppercorn A1 4-6-2).

On 11 June 2002, the restored 6233 Duchess of Sutherland was the first steam locomotive to haul the Royal Train for 35 years, transporting Queen Elizabeth II on a tour to North Wales, from Holyhead to Llandudno Junction, as part of her Golden Jubilee. The trip also marked the 160th anniversary of the first Royal train in 1842.

On 22 March 2005 Duchess of Sutherland again hauled the Royal Train, the second time for a steam locomotive in 40 years, transporting the Prince of Wales from Settle to Carlisle over the Settle-Carlisle Railway. The trip marked the 25th anniversary of the formation of the "Friends of the Settle and Carlisle" pressure group. On the trip, the Prince spent a 15-minute spell behind the controls of the locomotive.

On 10 June 2008, 6024 King Edward I hauled the Royal Train, transporting the Prince of Wales and the Duchess of Cornwall on board, from Kidderminster Town to Bridgnorth, on a visit to the Severn Valley Railway. Once again The Prince of Wales took the controls of the locomotive for a period.

On 19 February 2009 the Royal Train was hauled by the first standard-gauge steam locomotive to be built in Britain in over 40 years, 60163 Tornado, an LNER-design Peppercorn Class A1 4-6-2, with the Prince of Wales and the Duchess of Cornwall on board, the Prince travelling in the cab.

On 4 February 2010, Tornado again hauled the Royal Train, taking the Prince of Wales and the Duchess of Cornwall to the Museum of Science and Industry in Manchester.

On 24 January 2012, BR 70000 Britannia hauled the royal train taking the Prince of Wales from Preston to Wakefield for a renaming ceremony to commemorate 70000's recent return to traffic after an overhaul.

On 11 July 2012, the Queen visited Worcester and the train was hauled by namesake locomotive 6201 Princess Elizabeth. This was also one of the locomotives considered for use during the Queen's tour of North Wales in 2002, although 6233 Duchess of Sutherland was eventually chosen for the trip from Newport to Hereford, and then from Worcester to Oxford.

On 23 July 2012, Tornado again hauled the Royal Train, taking the Prince of Wales from Kemble to Alnmouth.

On 7 December 2018, 35028 Clan Line hauled the royal train taking the Prince of Wales to Cardiff.

Royal Train carriages

Historic carriages
The table below lists historic Royal Train carriages, from Britain and Ireland, in chronological order to 1977. Where a separate date is shown for building, the vehicle was converted rather than built new.

Fleet from 1977
In 1977, the Royal Train was considerably changed to update it for use during Elizabeth II's Silver Jubilee celebrations. A number of new carriages were added to the train, and old ones either refurbished or withdrawn. Since this time all Royal Train vehicles have been painted Royal Claret and numbered in a dedicated series commencing at 2900.

The new 1977 vehicles were converted Mark 3 carriages originally built for the prototype High Speed Train (HST) in the early 1970s.  The new formation has a higher maximum speed, depending on the locomotive, an important factor if slots are to be found for the train on crowded main lines.

Following the wedding of Prince Charles and Lady Diana Spencer on 29 July 1981, the honeymoon royal train configuration was formed with inspection saloon 975025 Caroline.

The table below lists all the vehicles used in the fleet since 1977 in numerical order.

Royal Train use

 
Although this type of travel is expensive compared to scheduled services, the train enables members of the Royal Family to carry out busy schedules over an extended period, in a secure environment that minimises disruption and inconvenience to the public and provides accommodation and office facilities. On at least one occasion, The Prince of Wales has conducted a dinner meeting on board the train.

Some members of Parliament have argued that the Royal Train, like the Royal Yacht, is an expensive under-used relic. However, the train was recognised as being a very secure way for the queen to complete overnight trips. The yearly cost of the Royal Train when it was introduced in 1977 for The Queen's Silver Jubilee was £1.9 million (equivalent to £ in ), and has since been considerably reduced. Edward Leigh, the Conservative chairman of the House of Commons Public Accounts Committee, said the Royal Train was twice as expensive as using air travel but hardly luxurious. He said, "It's a rather Formica-laminated affair. I don't think it's that grand or that comfortable."

In the FY 2011 the Royal Train was used for 14 trips, averaging . Ten trips were by The Prince of Wales, and four by The Queen and The Duke of Edinburgh. Nineteen nights were spent on the train during the course of the 14 trips. To control costs, Parliament permits the Royal Train to be used only by The King and Queen Consort, or The Prince and Princess of Wales.

In December 2020, the Duke and Duchess of Cambridge embarked on a three-day tour of England, Scotland, and Wales via the British Royal Train "to pay tribute to the inspiring work of individuals, organisations and initiatives across the country that have gone above and beyond to support their local communities" throughout the year. Prime Minister Boris Johnson expressed his support for the initiative, while First Minister of Scotland Nicola Sturgeon criticized the tour, citing travel restrictions; UK, Scottish and Welsh governments were consulted before planning the tour.

It was expected, following the announcement that Queen Elizabeth II had died on 8 September 2022 whilst at Balmoral Castle in Scotland, that the Royal Train would be used to convey the Queen's body from Edinburgh to London in preparation for her funeral. The use of the train had apparently been a long-standing part of plans prepared in the event that the Queen should die in Scotland. However, on 10 September, the Royal Household published details of arrangements for the funeral showing that the Queen's body would be conveyed by air instead.

See also
 Royal Mews
 State and royal cars of the United Kingdom
 List of royal yachts of the United Kingdom
 Royal barge of the United Kingdom
 Air transport of the Royal Family and government of the United Kingdom
 Royal trains in Canada

References

External links 

 The Royal Train & Wolverton Works 175th anniversary book official website
 About the British Royal Train from Website
 Royal Express is more Pizza than Orient , a description of the fixtures and fittings from The Scotsman, 2002
 Details of Royal Train diesel workings from 1968 to 1984
 Flickr Group : "Clerestory Coaches (Railways)"  with pictures of many historical UK Royal coaches, of Clerestory design. The wider collection includes coaches used from some Royal ovserseas tours, together with many other countries' Royal and Presidential trains, including many built during the 19th century.
  “The Secret History of the Royal Family's Train; For five generations, the train has helped most senior royals travel the country,” by Lauren Hubbard, Town & Country, Nov 16, 2020

British Rail coaching stock
British monarchy
Rail transport in Great Britain
DB Cargo UK
Network Rail
Royal vehicles
Rail transport of heads of state
British royal family